This article provides the list of Maraji (plural of Marja, the supreme legal authority or the source of emulation), followed by Twelver (also known as Imamiyyah) Shia Muslims around the world. The concept of a Marja-i Taqlid (lit. source of emulation) is central to Usuli Shi'a Islam. Marja-i Taqlids provide religious interpretations on matters of law and rituals. Ideally, the most just and knowledgeable specialist in the field of the Islamic law should become recognized throughout the Muslim world as the Marja-i Taqlid. In practice however this rarely happens and there are several marja taqlids among whom an individual is free to choose and emulate.

Those clerics who reach the apex in the hirerachy of theological rank in the centers of Shi'a learning become Marja-i Taqlids. Since around 1940, Marja-i Taqlids are often referred to by their followers with the honorific title of Ayatollah al-`Uzma (Grand Ayatollah - "ayatollah" meaning "sign of God"). Among the functions of Marja-i Taqlids is the collection and distribution of religious taxes (zakat and khums).

Current

The names are ordered by age (from Oldest to youngest).

Deceased
See: List of deceased Maraji

See also
Marja
Ijtihad
Ayatollah
List of Ayatollahs
List of Hujjatul Islams

References

External links
 Prominent Ulamaa, prior to 100 years
 Comprehensive List of Ulamaa / Jurists & their books ' An Extract from A Shiite Encyclopedia - Hasan Amini
 Ulamaa Biographies (Jafariyanews.com)
 Introduction to Scholars 5th / 11th century (al-islam.org)
 Scholars Info (Playandlearn.org)
ar:قائمة مراجع الشيعة
ur:شیعہ مراجع کی فہرست

Marja
Shia Islam by country

Ayatollahs